Margot Robbie is an Australian actress and producer. After playing minor roles in several films and television shows, Robbie starred in her first major role as Donna Freedman on the soap opera Neighbours (2008–2011), which she received a nomination for the Logie Award for Most Popular New Female Talent and Most Popular Actress. For her breakout role in Martin Scorsese's biographical black comedy film The Wolf of Wall Street (2013), she received an Empire Award for Best Female Newcomer. Since 2016, Robbie has received several awards and nominations, including one Critics' Choice Movie Award and one People's Choice Award for portraying the DC Extended Universe (DCEU) character Harley Quinn.

She co-produced and played figure skater Tonya Harding in I, Tonya (2017), a role that garnered her a nomination for Academy Award, BAFTA Award, and Golden Globe Award for Best Actress. The following year, Robbie played Elizabeth I in historical drama film Mary Queen of Scots, which nominated her for the BAFTA Award for Best Actress in a Supporting Role and the Screen Actors Guild Award for Outstanding Performance by a Female Actor in a Supporting Role. She starred in Jay Roach's drama Bombshell (2019), based upon the accounts of the women at Fox News who set out to expose CEO Roger Ailes for sexual harassment. Robbie's performance in the film garnered critical acclaim and earned her nominations for the Academy Award for Best Supporting Actress, the BAFTA Award for Best Actress in a Supporting Role, and the Golden Globe Award for Best Supporting Actress – Motion Picture. The same year, her performance in Quentin Tarantino's comedy-drama Once Upon a Time in Hollywood garnered her another nomination for BAFTA Award for Best Actress in a Supporting Role.


Awards and nominations

References

External links 
 List of awards and nominations at IMDb

Robbie, Margot
Awards